Blown to Smithereens: Best of The Smithereens is the first compilation album by The Smithereens, released April 4, 1995 by Capitol Records. It features the band's best-known songs and radio hits from 1983's Beauty and Sadness EP to the 1994 album, A Date with The Smithereens. The album also includes a cover of The Outsiders 1966 hit, "Time Won't Let Me", recorded for the film Timecop and released as a single in August 1994.

Blown to Smithereens has sold 188,000 copies, according to Nielsen SoundScan.

Track listing

Personnel 
Credits adapted from the album's liner notes and Discogs.com.
The Smithereens
Pat DiNizio – vocals, guitar
Jim Babjak – guitar, backing vocals
Mike Mesaros – bass, backing vocals
Dennis Diken – drums, percussion, backing vocals
for track information see individual albums
"Time Won't Let Me" personnel
Jimmy Wood –  harmonica 
Ron Fair – organ, production 
Bennett Kaufman – production 
The Smithereens – production
Michael C. Ross – engineering 
Tom Lord-Alge – mix
George Marino – mastering (Sterling Sound, NYC)
Recorded June 1994 at Record Plant, NYC and Music Grinder, Hollywood, CA  
Production
Wayne Watkins – project director
Cheryl Pawelski – compilation producer, compiled by
Brett Milano – liner notes
Larry Walsh – mastering
Tommy Steele – art direction
Andy Engel – design
Don Miller – cover photography

References

External links
 Blown to Smithereens: Best of the Smithereens on Discogs.com. Retrieved on 11 February 2018.

1995 greatest hits albums
The Smithereens albums